Karena Chapman is an Australian chemist who is the Joseph W Lauher & Frank W Fowler Endowed Chair in Materials Chemistry at Stony Brook University. Her research considers the use of high energy X-rays to better understand the structure property relationships of energy materials.

Early life and education 
Chapman was an undergraduate student at the University of Sydney. She remained in Australia for doctoral research, studying molecular framework materials. During her PhD, Chapman completed her crystallography measurements at Argonne National Laboratory. Chapman then joined the Argonne National Laboratory as an Arthur Holly Compton Fellow.

Research and career 
Chapman joined the high energy X-ray beamline of the X-ray science division at the Argonne National Laboratory in 2009. She developed approaches to better understand the structures of materials during operation. For example, she is interested in what's happening to the structure of batteries during charging/discharging. After nine years at Argonne, Chapman joined the faculty at Stony Brook University, where she was appointed the Joseph Lauher and Frank Fowler Endowed Chair in Materials Chemistry. She directs a centre focused on energy research, part of the United States Department of Energy Energy Frontier Research Centers.

Chapman's research considers the development of new materials for batteries, catalysis and gas capture. She has worked on the development of high X-ray based fidelity tools to identify structure-property relationships in these materials.

Personal life 
Chapman has said that her role model is Clare Grey.

Awards and honours 
 2012 American Physical Society Spotless Award
 2015 Materials Research Society Outstanding Young Investigator Award
 2016 C&E News Talented Twelve
 2021 Appointed Senior Editor at American Chemical Society Letters
 2022 International Centre for Diffraction Data Hanawalt Award

Selected publications

References 

Australian women chemists
Living people
Year of birth missing (living people)
Stony Brook University faculty
University of Sydney alumni
Argonne National Laboratory people
Australian materials scientists